"She Cries Your Name" is a song by Beth Orton. It was released as her third single and found on her 1996 debut album Superpinkymandy and again, as a slightly different version, on her 1996 release Trailer Park. It was also re-released in 1997, with a different set of B-sides.

Background
An early version of "She Cries Your Name" appeared on the 1995 William Orbit album Strange Cargo Hinterland. This version was substantially different from Orton's solo versions, removing most of the folk elements. Orton would later repurpose her chorus on the Orton song, sung repeatedly with layered vocals, as the chorus of her solo version of the track.

The 1996 re-release of "She Cries Your Name" was the lead single from Trailer Park. 

Both releases contain 4 songs, and were released on CD and vinyl. The initial release peaked at #76, and the re-release at #40 in the UK official singles chart.

Video
The video for "She Cries Your Name" was shot in a trailer park in the Mojave Desert, which inspired the title of Orton's Trailer Park LP. MTV placed the video into active rotation on September 16, 1997.

Reception
Critics praised Orton's blend of genres on "She Cried Your Name," one reviewer for Option calling the blend of trip-hop, folk music, and soul music "smooth." BBC London presenter Gary Crowley, speaking to Billboard, called "She Cried Your Name" "a fantastic piece of mood music, like a singer/songwriter with a club feel." Spin critic Sarah Vowell called the single the standout track from Trailer Park: "a bittersweet ballad that tastes like tea brewed from tears." 

A 2009 retrospective in Pitchfork praised the single's longevity, in particular Orton's "cozy, impressionistic Americana sketches" of the lyrics and the production by Victor Van Vugt.

Track listing

CD: Heavenly / HVN 60CD United Kingdom 
 "She Cries Your Name" - 4:48
 "Tangent" - 7:29
 "Safety" - 2:11
 "It's Not the Spotlight" (Barry Goldberg, Gerry Goffin) (Rod Stewart cover) - 4:18

 1996 release

CD: Heavenly / HVN 68CD United Kingdom
 "She Cries Your Name" - 4:48
 "Bullet" - 4:38
 "Best Bit" - 3:05
 "It's Not the Spotlight" - 4:18

 1997 re-release

References

Beth Orton songs
1990s ballads
1996 singles
1996 songs
Torch songs
Folk ballads
Heavenly Recordings singles
Songs written by Beth Orton
Songs written by William Orbit